is a brackish lake near Akkeshi in Hokkaidō, Japan. The wetlands of Lake Akkeshi and  have been designated a Ramsar site.

Wetlands

It is surrounded by salt marsh, fens, and bogs.

Birds
Since a part of this lake does not freeze, whooper swans and ducks winter there. The white-tailed eagle and Steller's sea eagle also visit. There is a 381ha Japanese crane sanctuary.

Sustainable use
Fishing and the aquaculture of oysters and clams occur in the lake.

See also
Ramsar sites in Japan

References

External links
 Akkeshi-ko and Bekambeushi-shitsugen Ramsar Site

Akkeshi
Ramsar sites in Japan
Akkeshi, Hokkaido